Lawrence Livermore may refer to:
Larry Livermore, musician, record producer and music journalist.
Lawrence Livermore National Laboratory